Lourdes Catholic School is a private, Roman Catholic school in Nogales, Arizona, United States.  It is located in the Roman Catholic Diocese of Tucson.

Background
Lourdes Catholic is a bicultural, bilingual Catholic school founded in 1934. It began as the parochial Sacred Heart School, which was administered by the Minim Daughters of Mary Immaculate. In 1940, the sisters also established the Our Lady of Lourdes Academy, which served grades 4–6. The two schools were intertwined and joined by a third school in 1986, Our Lady of Lourdes High School, in response to demand from local parents. As a result of negotiations with the diocese in 1998 that aimed to privatize Sacred Heart School, the three schools unified as Lourdes Catholic School, an action confirmed by the unification of all three schools on one campus in 2001.

References

External links
 School website

Hispanic and Latino American culture in Arizona
Catholic secondary schools in Arizona
Schools in Santa Cruz County, Arizona
Catholic Church in Arizona
Educational institutions established in 1934
1934 establishments in Arizona
Nogales, Arizona